Since the creation of the Senate Committee on the Judiciary (Judiciary Committee) in 1816, many, but not all, nominations for the Supreme Court of the United States have been first referred to a committee for review prior to facing a confirmation vote before the full United States Senate. Some nominations have been withdrawn, lapsed, or been postponed without being referred to the Judiciary Committee, while some others up until 1941 had proceeded to full Senate confirmation votes without first being reviewed by the Judiciary Committee. However, ever since 1941, all nominations have been referred to the Judiciary Committee.

In the 19th century and portions of the early 20th century, Judiciary Committee reviews were brief and entailed rather cursory looks at the nominee. However, increasingly since the 1910s, the process became more rigorous. The 1916 nomination of Louis Brandeis was the first to feature public hearings on the nomination and only the second recorded instance of any form of hearings being a part of a Judiciary Committee review of a Supreme Court nomination. However, from after Brandeis’ 1916 hearings until the mid-1930s, it was regarded as a courtesy to spare nominees from hearings. However, after controversy arose when it was reported shortly after Hugo Black was confirmed in 1937 without much deliberation and without any hearings that he had had association with the Ku Klux Klan, this was changed and it became more common for hearings to be held and for confirmations. The first nominee to testify at hearings on their own nomination was Harlan F. Stone in 1925, but he was the only one to do so until after the controversy surrounding Hugo Black. Since Harold Hitz Burton in 1946, no nominee has proceeded to a confirmation vote without hearings, and only four nominations that have been put forth have since failed to have hearings (all four of which lapsed or were withdrawn without confirmation votes). In more recent confirmations, hearings have often lasted around four or five days.

In more recent practice, between the announcement of the nomination and the start of hearings, the Judiciary Committee undertakes an investigative stage in which committee members and their staffs prepare for the hearings by looking over the background of the nominees and relevant issues. During this stage, nominees are typically prepped by the presidential administration for the hearings, including holding grueling mock-hearings often-dubbed “murder boards”. The nominee also often pays “courtesy call” visits to the offices of individual United States Senators. The American Bar Association's Standing Committee on the Federal Judiciary also usually provides their evaluation of the nominee's qualifications in this period before hearings are held.

Typically, at the end of its reviews of nominations, the Judiciary Committee has reported to the full Senate on the nomination. Often these reports have included either a positive or negative assessment of a nomination. The decision of how the Judiciary Committee reports has been conducted by a vote of its members. Historically, the Judiciary Committee had often published printed volumes outlining its members’ views. However, this has not occurred with any nominations in the 21st century.

Overview of the Judiciary Committee review process
Since 1829, many Supreme Court nominations had been referred to the Senate's Judiciary Committee. In 1868, the Senate adopted a rule that nominations needed to be referred to appropriate standing committees, which has resulted in nearly all subsequent Supreme Court nominations being referred to the Judiciary Committee.

In modern practice, the Judiciary Committee assumes the main responsibility of investigating the qualifications and background of each nominee. Judiciary Committee reviews are not mentioned in the United States Constitution, but have become an important intermediary process between the nomination of a nominee by a president and a vote on the confirmation. The most recent nomination to face a confirmation vote without first being referred to the Judiciary Committee was the 1941 nomination of James F. Byrnes.

From the late-1960s onwards, the Judiciary Committee's review process has nearly always consisted first of the pre-hearing investigative stage, followed by public hearings, and ending with a committee decision on what recommendation the committee should make to the full Senate.

The period of time between nominations and confirmation are longer in recent decades than they once were. Before the early 1950s, the average period of time between nominations being made and votes on confirmation was 13.2 days. In contrast, for nominations spanning between the 1954 nomination of Earl Warren to the 2020 nomination of Amy Coney Barrett, the average time was 54.4 days. This, in part, reflects the fact that more thorough Judiciary Committee reviews have become a regular practice.

Pre-hearing investigative stage
In modern practice, the period between the nomination being made and the beginning of hearings is utilized by the committee as an investigative stage. This period of time is, in modern practice, intended to be utilized by the committee members and their staffs to prepare for the hearings by looking over the background of the nominees and issues that are relevant to their nominations.

For confirmations with hearings, the amount of time that has passed between the receipt of a nomination by the Senate and the start of the first hearing has differed by nomination. The shortest time interval between these was the four days between the receipt of both the 1932 nomination of Benjamin N. Cardozo and the 1939 nomination of William O. Douglas and the beginning of hearings on those nominations. The second-shortest time interval between these occurrences was the five days between the receipt of both the 1938 nomination of Stanley F. Reed and the 1939 nomination of Felix Frankfurter and the beginning of hearings on the nominations. The longest time interval between these occurrences was the 82 days between the receipt of the 1959 nomination of Potter Stewart and the beginning of hearings on that nomination. The second-longest time interval between those occurrences was the 70 days between the receipt of the 1987 nomination  of Robert Bork and the beginning of hearings on that nomination. From the 1960s onwards, the amount of time taken between the receipt of nominations and start of hearings increased over what it had tended to be prior. Prior to 1967 there was a median of only ten days between the receipt of nominations and the beginning of hearings on them. For all nominations between Thurgood Marshall's 1967 nomination and Amy Coney Barrett's 2020 nomination, the median was 27 days between the Senate's receipt of nomination and the beginning of confirmation hearings. Since the 1990s, the Judiciary Committee has typically allowed at least four weeks to elapse between the Senate's receipt of a nomination and the beginning of confirmation hearings. Of the twelve confirmations held since the 1990s, the shortest period between the receipt of the nomination and the start of hearings is the 21 days between the receipt of the 2022 nomination of Ketanji Brown Jackson and the beginning of hearings on her nomination. The second-shortest period between nomination and the start of hearings  of the twelve nominations since the start of the 1990s is the 28 that elapsed between the receipt of the 1990 nomination of David Souter and the start of hearings on his nomination.

It has become a long-standing tradition for nominees to, during this stage, pay "courtesy call" visits to individual senators at their offices, including those senators not on the Judiciary Committee. Also, in typical modern practice, during this pre-hearing stage, the American Bar Association's Standing Committee on the Federal Judiciary provides their evaluation of the nominee's qualifications.

In modern practice, during this period, the presidential administration usually helps to prepare their nominee for hearings by providing them with legal background materials and by holding mock-hearings  with the nominee for practice. These mock-hearings are often called "murder boards" in reference to the grueling demands they place on the nominees.

Hearings

The first recorded instance in which formal hearings are known to have been held by the Judiciary Committee (or any other committee) in regards to a Supreme Court nomination was on December 16, 1873, when the first of two closed-door hearings was held by the committee to review documents and hear relevant testimony from witnesses about a controversy that had arisen about the nomination of George Henry Williams. This controversy, pertaining to a probe into his use of Department of Justice funds for personal household expenses, had arisen after the committee had issued its initial favorable report on his nomination (approved by the committee on December 11, 1873), but the Senate voted on December 15, 1873 to recommit the nomination (sending it back to committee). There were no more recorded instances of formal committee hearings for a Supreme Court nomination until the 1916 nomination of Louis D. Brandeis, when open door hearings were held.

While there was only one recorded instance of a Supreme Court nomination having Judiciary Committee hearings prior to 1916, Judiciary Committee hearings have since become a regular practice for Supreme Court nominations. They became increasingly prevalent between 1925 and 1946. The 1946 nomination of Harold Hitz Burton is the most recent nomination to proceed to a confirmation vote without having had formal hearings while before the Senate Judiciary Committee. Since then only four nominations put forth by presidents have gone without hearings. Two of these instances (the 2005 nominations of John Roberts and Harriet Miers to the associate judgeship being vacated by the retiring Sandra Day O'Connor) saw the nominations be withdrawn before hearings could be held. Another instance was when the 1954 nomination of John Marshall Harlan II was referred to committee only to lapse without hearings. The most recent instance was when the 2016 nomination of Merrick Garland lapsed without any Senate action.

The first nominee to appear before the committee themselves and testify at their own confirmation hearings was Harlan F. Stone in 1925. From after Brandeis' 1916 hearings until the mid-1930s, it had been seen as a courtesy to spare nominees from hearings, particularly as nominees were often already well-regarded individuals, and because hearings were seen as being tied to the appearance of scandal. Additionally, nominees did not appear to testify in-person when hearings did occur (with the exception of Harlan F. Stone).  However, this began to change after the confirmation of Hugo Black in 1937. Black had been quickly confirmed after only five days of deliberation, and without any public hearings on the nomination. A month after his confirmation, the Pittsburgh Post-Gazette first reported that Black had been a member of the Ku Klux Klan. President Franklin Roosevelt, who had nominated Black, denied having known this about him. The fact that such an individual had been speedily confirmed without the diligence of having hearings brough concern that the confirmation process was flawed. Time magazine referred to this as, "the prize political scandal of the year." Not too long after, in 1939, Felix Frankfurter became the second Supreme Court nominee to testify at his own confirmation hearings, and was the first to do so at the request of the Judiciary Committee and the first to do so in open session. Frankfurter's testimony only addressed what he regarded to have been slanderous allegations raised against him.

The modern questioning of nominees on their judicial views arose with the nomination hearings for John Marshall Harlan in 1955. His nomination followed shortly after the landmark Brown v. Board of Education decision by the Supreme Court. Several senators from the Southern United States threatened to obstruct Harlan's confirmation, which persuaded Harlan to provide his testimony at hearings. Most nominees since Harlan have appeared before the Judiciary Committee. In the 1950s, 1960s, and part of the 1970, many hearings were perfunctorily. Few hearings saw extended questioning or comments from members of the Judiciary Committee. In these decades, hearings were not lengthy either, with nominees typically only spending a few hours before the committee.

During the late civil rights and post-Watergate eras,  hearings began to see more substantive issues be discussed. This, according to Robert Katzmann, "reflects in part the increasing importance of the Supreme Court to interest groups in the making of public policy." With this transformation have come longer confirmation hearings. In 1967, for example, Thurgood Marshall spent about seven hours in front of the committee. In 1987, Robert Bork was questioned for 30 hours over five days, with the hearings as a whole lasting for 12 days. An estimated 150–300 interest groups were involved in the Bork confirmation process.

Hearings for recent nominations have typically lasted four or five days. The Senate may decide to hold additional hearings if a nomination becomes controversial, an example of this being the eleven days of hearings given to the 1983 nomination of Robert Bork.

The first hearings to receive gavel-to-gavel television coverage was those for the 1981 nomination of Sandra Day O'Connor.

The table below notes the approximate number of hours that media sources estimate Supreme Court nominees since 2005 (excluding those whose nomination was withdrawn) have spent before the Senate Judiciary Committee for public testimony:

Reports
The Judiciary Committee generally gives a report to the Senate in modern practice. Typically, the committee meets in open session within a week of the end of hearings in order to determine what their report will be. Typical practice is to report even on nominations the majority of the committee opposes, in order to allow for the full Senate to make a final decision on whether to confirm or not. Without an affirmative vote, a nomination cannot proceed to the floor of the Senate unless the Senate votes to discharge it from the committee. The rarely needed parliamentary procedure of discharging a nomination from committee was used to move the 2022 nomination of Ketanji Brown Jackson forward after the Judiciary Committee deadlocked along party lines in a vote on whether to give it a favorable recommendation.

While early reports typically did not include an assessment or recommendation, it had since become common practice for reports to. The 1991 nomination of Clarence Thomas was the most recent instance in which the Judiciary Committee voted to report without a recommendation (which it did only after an earlier committee vote on whether to report positively on his nomination had failed to pass). The most recent instance where no recommendation was given, however, was the 2022 confirmation of Ketanji Brown Jackson, with the aforementioned move by the Senate to vote without a Judiciary Committee recommendation after the committee deadlocked. However, unlike with Thomas' nomination, the move to advance from committee review to full-Senate consideration of the confirmation without a recommendation was not made by a vote of the Judiciary Committee, but rather by a vote of the full Senate.

Seven nominations have received negative committee report (either an “unfavorable” recommendation, an “adverse” report, or a report featuring a “recommendation not to act”). The only two instances in which the Senate has confirmed a nominee that had received a negative committee report were the nominations of Stanley Matthews in 1881 and Lucius Quintus Cincinnatus Lamar in 1888. The most recent instance in which the committee gave a nomination a negative report was the 1987 nomination of Robert Bork, whose nomination was rejected by the Senate.

Only six nominations that have received favorable committee reports have failed to result in a confirmation.

While, previously, the Senate Judiciary Committee regularly provided printed committee reports, from the 2005 nomination of John Roberts onwards, nominations have gone without one. Printed were prepared behind closed doors after the committee has held their vote and provided a single volume outlining the views of committee members on the nomination as well as supplemental minority or additional views.

Judiciary Committee chairs
The Judiciary Committee is led by a chair.

Two Judiciary Committee chairs (Martin Van Buren and Joe Biden) would subsequently serve as president of the United States. Both put forward nominations to the Supreme Court during their presidencies. However, of the two, only Biden had any nominations referred to the Judiciary Committee during his tenure as its chair.

One Judiciary Committee chair, John J. Crittenden, was subsequently nominated to the Supreme Court. Crittenden was not confirmed, however, as his nomination lapsed after a recommendation from the Judiciary Committee that the Senate not act on the nomination. During Crittenden's tenure as Judiciary Committee chair, no nominations were recorded as having been formally reviewed by the committee. In fact, his own subsequent nomination is the first recorded instance of the committee receiving a nomination for review.

Below is a table listing chairs of the Senate Judiciary Committee, with the number of nominations that were referred to the committee during their tenure(s) as chair:

Actions on nominations by other committees prior to the creation of the Senate Judiciary Committee

List of Judiciary Committee actions
The following is a list of Senate Judiciary Committee actions on nominations for the Supreme Court of the United States. Excluded from this list are nominations for which there either was no committee referral or for which no record exists of any committee referral.

Motions to refer nominations to the Judiciary Committee
Several times the Senate has held votes on whether to have the Judiciary Committee review a nomination.

Motions to recommit
Several votes have been held on whether to return a nomination to committee for further review.

Other motions
The 1826 nomination of Robert Trimble by John Quincy Adams saw a successful effort to first refer the nomination to the Judiciary Committee, with the Senate voting to reject the motion to do so. The Senate defeated a motion to refer this nomination to the Judiciary Committee by a 7–25 vote on May 9, 1826. The Senate confirmed the nomination later that day.

Nominations that were not referred to the Judiciary Committee
The following outlines United States Supreme Court nominations that were not referred to the Judiciary Committee

Nominations predating creation of the Judiciary Committee

After the creation of the Judiciary Committee

Notes

References

Nominations to the United States Supreme Court
Judiciary Committee reviews of nominations the Supreme Court of the United States